Phoenix Monsoon is an amateur soccer team based in Phoenix, Arizona.

History 
Founded in 2010, the team played in the National Premier Soccer League, the fourth division of the United States soccer pyramid in 2012. The Monsoon made their debut playing an outdoor exhibition game against FC Edmonton of the NASL on March 19, 2011, losing 5–0.
 The Monsoon reorganized in February 2014. A part of a United Premier Soccer League expansion into Arizona, the Monsoon joined the league for the 2015–16 winter season.

Season-by-season

Honors
 UPSL 2015–16 UPSL Arizona Conference winner

References

External links 
 Phoenix Monsoon FC website
 Phoenix Monsoon FC Twitter

Sports in Phoenix, Arizona
Soccer clubs in Arizona
Association football clubs established in 2010
2010 establishments in Arizona